The 2020 FIBA Women's Olympic Qualifying Tournament in Belgrade was one of four 2020 FIBA Women's Olympic Qualifying Tournaments. The tournament was held in Belgrade, Serbia, from 6 to 9 February 2020.

Serbia and Nigeria qualified for the Olympics, alongside the United States, who were pre-qualified as the 2018 FIBA World Cup winner.

Teams

Venue

Squads

Standings

Results
All times are local (UTC+1).

Statistics and awards

Statistical leaders
Players

Points

Rebounds

Assists

Blocks

Steals

Teams

Points

Rebounds

Assists

Blocks

Steals

Awards
The all star-teams and MVP were announced on 9 February 2020.

References

External links
Official website

FIBA World Olympic Qualifying Tournament for Women
     
Qual
2019–20 in Serbian basketball
International women's basketball competitions hosted by Serbia
Sport in Belgrade